Studénka train disaster may refer to:
 2008 Studénka train disaster - Train disaster which occurred on 8 August 2008.
 2015 Studénka train crash - Train crash which occurred on 22 July 2015.